Estadio Parque Barrio Ilolay is a multi-use stadium in Rafaela, Argentina.  It is currently used primarily for football matches by Club Sportivo Ben Hur. The stadium has a capacity of 12,000 people.

References

Parque Barrio Ilolay